R. D. Raja is an Indian film producer, creative producer, lyricist and movie promotion consultant who primarily works in the Tamil film Industry also known for his films produced in Tamil cinema through his production company, 24AM Studios.

Early years
R. D. Raja started his career as promotion consultant. He promoted movies like Boss Engira Bhaskaran, 7am Arivu, Vazhakku Enn 18/9, Kedi Billa Killadi Ranga, and Jilla. He worked as creative producer for films like Kedi Billa Killadi Ranga, Varuthapadatha Valibar Sangam, and Maan Karate. In 2016, R. D. Raja debuts as a fully-fledged film producer, where he produced Remo under debutant Bakiyaraj Kannan's directorial, which has Sivakarthikeyan and Keerthy Suresh in the lead, and the film opened to positive reviews. R. D. Raja collaborates with Sivakarthikeyan again, in Mohan Raja's film, Velaikkaran which are released in 2017. R. D. Raja subsequently producing director Ponram's latest film, titled Seema Raja, where Sivakarthikeyan plays the lead role. He also signed a film with Sivakarthikeyan again, under R. Ravikumar's directorial.

Filmography
 As a producer

As a lyricist

References

External links
 

Living people
Indian film producers
Tamil film producers
Place of birth missing (living people)
Year of birth missing (living people)